Nemo propheta in patria is a Latin phrase meaning "no man is a prophet in his own land." It may refer to:

 a concept present in all four Gospels
 a catalog published in 1976 by Guglielmo Achille Cavellini